Central Park, also known as Gorky Park, is an urban park located in the Medeu District of Almaty. The park includes different types of trees such as elm, oak, aspen, maple, pine, spruce, poplar, and birch; artificial water reservoirs, attractions such as a water park, movie theater, sports complex, cultural venues, and public catering establishments. There are also children's attractions, which include a children's railway, an aqua park and other entertainment venues. In 2013, the territory of the Central Park is only 42 hectares, while in 1983, it was over 100 hectares.

History

Early history (1850s–1860s)
The history of the park goes back to the emergence of civil settlements around the fortification of Verniy and the development of fisheries. For the first time, the park was laid as a public garden by a scientist-gardener G. Krishtopenko in 1856; in the floodplain of the Malaya Almatinka river, as a place for walking and resting officers of the Vernensky garrison. Krishtopenko, who had experience in the Crimea, planted the first deciduous and coniferous trees in the garden. For his work, Krishtopenko drew lovers of gardening-vernentsev Kutaberdin, Sergeev, Chvanov and others. After studying the climatic conditions and the structure of the soil, Krishtopenko came to the conclusion that not only Central Asian plants, but also species characteristic of Central Russia could grow in the garden, as well as in the entire fortification of the city. In 1868, the seedlings and the seeds were delivered to Verniy from the Nikitsky Botanical Garden, and the Penza School of Horticulture in Tashkent.

Baum-Karlu period (1869–1900s)

In the years from 1869 to 1875, a greenhouse was built, flowerbeds were broken, a children's playground was set up for planting, and the Eduard Baum, a school of horticulture was opened for 10-15 pupils. In 1874, Krishtopenko handed over his leadership the brother of the famous forester of Verniy, Eduard Baum-Karlu. Because of this, the park turned into a place of national holidays. The State Garden was intended for the cultivation of fruit,  ornamental plants, vegetables, raising silk and the creation of apiaries.  

With the creation of the city, the park became a place of relaxation for the citizens. Buffet and kitchens were set up, dance floors and gazebos were built, and yurts for billiards and tables for games were installed. In Tsarist times, the entrance was paid accessed.

Later history (1900s–1980)

During the 1905 Russian Revolution, laborer workers along with the youths held rallies and gatherings at the logs. During the Russian Civil War in 1918, a defensive Red Army line was located in the park. In 1919, an Aytysh was held in the park with the participation of the city Aulie-Ata (present day Taraz). In 2014, a street workout location was launched at the park.

In 1934, the park was reconstructed, recreation centers for workers of Alma-Ata were located on the banks of the deepened reservoir, and attractions were equipped. A unique irrigation and ditch system has been created, covering the entire park. In the eastern part, a zoo was created on the former clover sites. In 1935, the park received name as Gorky Park of Culture and Rest where a monument to Maxim Gorky was erected in 1940. From 1980, the park has been called as Gorky Central Park of Culture and Rest.

Privatization and recent history (1997–present) 

In 1997, a contract was signed between the Akimat and the Altyn-Taraz Trade and Finance Company LLP, according to which the LLP received the trust management for a period of five years with the subsequent redemption of the property complex of the park. On 30 January 2004, on the basis of a sale and purchase agreement concluded between TFC Altyn-Taraz LLP and the Almaty Territorial Committee of State Property and Privatization, which acted by power of attorney in the interests of the akimat, the property complex of the Central Park was purchased by the LLP in the privatization procedure. On the registered rights to immovable property and its technical characteristics issued by the Department of Justice of Almaty, the ownership of this property was duly formalized and registered.

After the territory of the park was became privately owned, the owners of the Aquapark, built on a small lake in order to get as much profit from it as possible, drained a large lake. It was officially confirmed by the Balkhash-Alakol Department of Ecology that during the construction of the parking lot, the management of TFC Altyn-Taraz LLP allowed the unauthorized felling of green plantings in the amount of 124 pieces, the damage to the environment amounted to 1,029,730 tenge for housing construction. A residential complex was erected on a significant part of the park, despite the fact that in the register of subjected the use and protection of the water fund of the Ministry of Agriculture. On the territory of the park, it became impossible to walk safely, with vehicles quietly driving around. Due to the elementary lack of irrigation and maintenance, about a hundred oak trees died.

The Central Park, despite the deterioration of its condition for many years became a favorite place for recreation of Almaty residents and guests which remains to this day.

On 15 August 2013, trees began to be cut down in the park which over 2000 were planned. According to Erkebulan Orazalin, deputy head of the Department of Natural Resources of Almaty,  no permit had been obtained for logging and was carried out illegally. The irrigation ditch system is not currently operating in the park.

In 2018, the park was reconstructed. At the parking site, there are children's and street workout playgrounds, basketball and football fields, a rollerdrome and a skate track. Modern lighting, benches have been installed throughout the territory, idle fountains and an amphitheater have been updated. About 1.6 billion tenge of private funds were invested in the modernization of the park.

References

Parks in Almaty
1856 establishments in the Russian Empire
Urban public parks
Botanical gardens
Event venues established in 1856